<noinclude>

Panja Sai Dharam Tej (born 15 October 1986) is an Indian actor who works in Telugu films. Related to the Allu–Konidela family, he made his acting debut with the box office success Pilla Nuvvu Leni Jeevitham (2014) for which he received SIIMA Award for Best Male Debut and CineMAA Awards Best Male Debut.

Post his debut, Tej appeared in films such as Subramanyam for Sale (2015) and Supreme (2016), which were box office successes. This was followed with back to back critical and commercial failures. Tej then went onto establish himself with successful films Chitralahari (2019) and Prati Roju Pandage both (2019). His other notable works include Solo Brathuke So Better (2020) and Republic  (2021).

Early life and background
Sai Tej was born to Vijaya Durga, sister of notable Telugu film actor-politician Chiranjeevi on 15 October 1986. Tej did his schooling at Nalanda School, Hyderabad and completed his graduation from St. Mary's College, Hyderabad. 

Actors Allu Arjun, Ram Charan, Allu Sirish, Varun Tej and Niharika Konidela are Tej's cousins. His younger brother Vaisshnav Tej is also an actor. Pawan Kalyan and Nagendra Babu are his maternal uncles.

Career

Debut and early work (2014–2016) 
Tej made his film debut with the film Pilla Nuvvu Leni Jeevitham, opposite Regina Cassandra in 2014. The film was a hit at the box office. Times of India noted, "Sai Dharam Tej’s rustic charm makes his actions believable. The actor is particularly quite impressive with his dance moves". While Deccan Chronicle stated, "Sai Dharam Tej delivers a mature performance. He entertains throughout the film with his performance and he has done this quite comfortably." He received SIIMA Award for Best Male Debut - Telugu for his performance.

Tej had two releases in 2015. His first film was Rey where he portrayed Rock opposite Saiyami Kher. 123telugu said, "Sai Dharam Tej’s electrifying performance is the major asset of this film." Tej's second release in 2015 was Subramanyam for Sale, which was successful at the box office, grossing over ₹33.95 crore. He starred alongside Regina Cassandra, for the second time, after Pilla Nuvvu Leni Jeevitham (2014). Although various critics called it "routine", Tej's performance was cited as "improved performance", "spontaneous", and "stunning".

Resurgence and other work (2016–2018)
Tej's action comedy Supreme which released the following year, was also financially successful and was one of his best movie. Following Supreme, Tej went onto star in five films (in lead), including Thikka (2016), Winner (2017), Jawaan (2017), Inttelligent (2018) and Tej I Love You (2018). Tej was also criticized for selecting similar and regular stories in his films.

Success and recent work (2019–present) 
Chitralahari was his first release of 2019. The film was a box office success with critics praising his performance and Tej giving one of his career best performance. The Times of India had called the character Vijay in the film, the best in Tej's career so far. About his role in the film, Deccan Chronicle reported that "Sai Tej has put on weight and with a beard looks fresh and fits the character. For this role, he has completely set aside his mass image". His next film of the year, Prati Roju Pandage was also successful. Murali Krishna CH of The New Indian Express in his review of the film, wrote that "The film definitely Sai Tej’s canvas and he delivers his standard chops with flamboyance". Later in 2020, his film Solo Brathuke So Better was released following the COVID-19 pandemic. Despite the restriction of 50% occupancy in cinemas, the film was successful at the box office. Idlebrain's Jeevi appreciated Tej's performance, particularly his comedy timing and acting in the emotional scenes of the film. In contrast, Y Sunita Chowdhary of The Hindu opined that "Tej could have benefited from a better script." 

In his next film Republic (2021), directed by Deva Katta, Tej played the role of an IAS officer. The film which is a political drama, opened to positive reviews, with critics calling his performance "matured" and the film was well received by audience and became a 'hit'. Prakash Pecheti of Telangana Today stated: "Republic surely adds a cap in the feather for Sai Dharam Tej."

Tej's next film is Virupaksha, a socio-fantasy thriller directed by Karthik Varma Dandu, of Bham Bolenath fame. He has also signed for a film with debutant Jayanth Panuganti and Sampath Nandi, respectively.

Personal life 
In September 2021, Tej was in a single-vehicle motorcycle accident near the Durgam Cheruvu Bridge in Hyderabad. He was admitted to Apollo Hospitals whose doctors announced that he sustained soft tissue injuries and a collar bone fracture but was out of danger.

Media image
Tej stood at the 25th place on Forbes India's most influential stars on Instagram in South cinema for the year 2021. He ranked 24th in Hyderabad Times Most Desirable Men list of 2016.
 
Tej turned brand ambassador for ‘Sky Zone Park’. He also became an ambassador for charity organisation 'Think Peace'.

Filmography

Films

Television

Accolades

References

External links
 
 

1986 births
Living people
Male actors from Hyderabad, India
Male actors in Telugu cinema
Indian male film actors
21st-century Indian male actors
South Indian International Movie Awards winners
Santosham Film Awards winners
Telugu male actors
CineMAA Awards winners